The River Cart Aqueduct, sometimes known as the Blackhall Bridge, is a railway bridge and former navigable aqueduct in Paisley, Renfrewshire, Scotland. It opened in 1811 as an aqueduct to carry the Glasgow, Paisley and Johnstone Canal over the White Cart Water. Following the closure of the canal in 1881, it was converted to a railway bridge in 1885, and now carries the Paisley Canal Line. It is registered as a Category A listed building by Historic Environment Scotland.

History
The aqueduct was built between 1808 and 1810, and opened in 1811 to carry the Glasgow, Paisley and Johnstone Canal. John Rennie and Thomas Telford were involved in the engineering process. The contractor was John Simpson and the cost of construction was £5,440.

The canal was closed in 1881, and converted to run the Paisley Canal Line, which opened in 1885.

Design
The bridge is probably the longest span masonry aqueduct of the canal age on a British canal, and one of the world's earliest bridges carrying a public railway. It was widened to carry the double track railway, and the line crosses the bridge at a slight skew because of the easing of the sharp canal curvature.

When the aqueduct carried the canal, it was only the width of a single boat, making it necessary to wait for another boat to pass at times.

See also
List of canal aqueducts in the United Kingdom
List of Category A listed buildings in Renfrewshire
List of listed buildings in Paisley, Renfrewshire
List of railway bridges and viaducts in the United Kingdom

References

External links

Railway bridges in Scotland
Transport in Renfrewshire
Aqueducts in Scotland
Bridges completed in 1811
Category A listed buildings in Renfrewshire
Buildings and structures in Paisley, Renfrewshire
1811 establishments in Scotland